Ann “Ma” McNulty (1887–1970), was a Melodeon (accordion) playing vaudevillian. She was widowed in 1928 in the wake of the Great Depression and determined to support herself and her 2 minor children. She took to the stage with these children, who were Eileen McNulty (1915–1989), a songstress and dancer, and Peter McNulty (1917–1960), a singer, dancer, violinist, pianist and, eventually, a composer of music and lyrics. Known as “The McNulty Family’s Irish Showboat Revue”, the trio first appeared on stage around 1932-1933 and through Ma’s astute show business acumen they almost immediately achieved a success that lasted for decades along the U.S. East Coast entertainment circuit.

The trio eventually appeared regularly on radio and at such venues as the Rockefeller Center's Radio City Music Hall, the Yorkville Casino, New York City’s Leitrim House and at Rockaway Beach, Queens. For 16 consecutive years the trio of "Ma" McNulty, Eileen McNulty and Peter McNulty sold out the Brooklyn Academy of Music’s 2,109 seat Howard Gillman Opera House. In their near 2 decades of music recording for labels like Decca Records, Standard and Copley from 1938-1956, the McNulty family’s “Showboat Revue” released 155 sides on 78-rpm shellac & vinyl. In 1953, they appeared through the then new entertainment venue of television on Milton Berle’s wildly popular Texaco Star Theater.

“Ma” McNulty did not appear on stage during her children's earlier duo performances. In 1926, after one theater’s “professor” was unable to keep proper time for her children, “Ma” began, herself, keeping time for them from backstage on an old melodeon accordion. By 1928, she had been encouraged to perform on stage with her children. Though by the late 1930s,  radio and motion pictures had already there and throughout the nation eclipsed as popular entertainment vaudeville, which had begun in the 1880s, the McNulty family managed to keep the art of Irish “vaudevillian” or variety theater alive on the U.S. East Coast well into the 1950s. The McNulty family had a powerful influence on the development of the Music of Newfoundland and Labrador in its modern era. Another testament to the popularity of the McNulty Family was the impressive number of recordings they made for Decca, Standard, and Copley: 155 sides on 78-rpm releases.

Partial discography
Likeable Loveable Leitrim Lad, composed entirely and performed in part by Peter McNulty
When I Mowed Pat Murphy’s Meadow 
A Mother’s Love is a Blessing
Boys from the County Cork
Mother Malone
Along the Rocky Road to Dublin
When Rafferty Brought the Rumba to the Town of Aughnacloy

See also
Music of Newfoundland and Labrador

References

Vaudeville performers
American accordionists
Women accordionists
1887 births
1970 deaths
20th-century accordionists
20th-century American musicians
20th-century American women musicians